Elachista hilda is a moth in the family Elachistidae. It was described by Edward Meyrick in 1932. It is found in Colombia.

References

Moths described in 1932
hilda
Moths of South America